Anthony James Venables, CBE, (born 25 April 1953), is a British economist and the BP Professor of Economics at the Department of Economics, University of Oxford.

Venables is known as one of the pioneers of New economic geography.  He co-authored along with Paul Krugman and Masahisa Fujita the influential book The Spatial Economy - Cities, Regions and International Trade (2001).

He is the current director of the Oxford Centre for the Analysis of Resource Rich Economies (OxCarre). He also serves on the Steering Group of the International Growth Centre. From 2005 to 2008, he held the position of Chief Economist at the UK Department for International Development.

Education
Venables studied economics at Clare College, Cambridge, where he obtained his B.A. in 1974. After completing his undergraduate degree, he then took up his studies at St. Antony's College, Oxford. He then became a lecturer at various universities before completing his D.Phil. in economics in 1984 from Worcester College, Oxford. He is a Fellow of New College, Oxford.

Selected bibliography

Books

References

External links 
 Venables' page at Oxford

1953 births
Alumni of Clare College, Cambridge
Alumni of St Antony's College, Oxford
Alumni of Worcester College, Oxford
British economists
Commanders of the Order of the British Empire
Fellows of New College, Oxford
International economists
Living people
Statutory Professors of the University of Oxford
Fellows of the Econometric Society